21-Crown-7 is an organic compound with the formula [C2H4O]7 and the IUPAC name of 1,4,7,10,13,16,19-heptaoxacycloheneicosane. Like other crown ethers, 21-crown-7 functions as a ligand for some metal cations with a particular affinity for caesium cations. The dipole moment of 21-crown-7 varies in different solvents and under different temperatures.

References

External links 
 ChemicalBook

Crown ethers
Macrocycles